The 2011–12 Biathlon World Cup – Individual Women began on Thursday December 1, 2011 in the Östersund and finished on Wednesday March 7, 2012 in the Ruhpolding at the Biathlon World Championships 2012 event. The defending titlist was Helena Ekholm of Sweden.

Competition format
The 15 kilometres (9.3 mi) individual race is the oldest biathlon event; the distance is skied over five laps. The biathlete shoots four times at any shooting lane, in the order of prone, standing, prone, standing, totalling 20 targets. For each missed target a fixed penalty time, usually one minute, is added to the skiing time of the biathlete. Competitors' starts are staggered, normally by 30 seconds.

2010–11 Top 3 Standings

Medal winners

Standings

References

- Individual Women, 2011-12 Biathlon World Cup